Eva Viola Elisabet "Ewa" Olliwier (later Lundqvist, 13 January 1904 – 7 August 1955) was a Swedish diver, who won bronze medals in the 10 m platform at the 1920 Summer Olympics and 1927 European Aquatics Championships. At the 1924 Summer Olympics she finished fourth in the 3 metre springboard and failed to reach the final in the platform.

References

Further reading 
 

1904 births
1955 deaths
Swedish female divers
Olympic divers of Sweden
Divers at the 1920 Summer Olympics
Divers at the 1924 Summer Olympics
Olympic bronze medalists for Sweden
Olympic medalists in diving
Divers from Stockholm
Medalists at the 1920 Summer Olympics
Stockholms KK divers
Women's World Games medalists
20th-century Swedish women